Prooftexts: A Journal of Jewish Literary History is a triannual peer-reviewed academic journal in the field of Jewish literature. It was established in 1981 and is published by Indiana University Press. The editors-in-chief are Barry Scott Wimpfheimer (Northwestern University) and Wendy Zierler (Hebrew Union College).

Abstracting and indexing
The journal is abstracted and indexed in:

References

External links
 

Triannual journals
Publications established in 1981
Indiana University Press academic journals
Judaic studies journals
English-language journals